Varney is a small community in Grey County, Ontario, Canada. Varney is located on Highway 6, about 5 kilometers south of Durham and 19 kilometers north of Mount Forest.

John Vernon Pettigrew, Men's Featherweight Wrestler (1936 Olympic Summer games), was born in Varney, in 1908.

Attractions
Varney International Speedway is a 1/4 mile high banked short track motor racing oval, located south of the village. The track hosts a weekly Saturday night stock car racing program that runs from May to September each year.

In the north end of the town, easily visible from the road, is the World's Largest Adirondack chair

See also

 List of unincorporated communities in Ontario

References

External links
Grey County official webpage

Communities in Grey County